Groß Plasten is a municipality in the Mecklenburgische Seenplatte district, in Mecklenburg-Vorpommern, Germany. The former municipality Varchentin was merged into Groß Plasten in May 2019.

References